Silja Kosonen (born 16 December 2002) is a Finnish hammer thrower. She competed in the 2020 Summer Olympics. She won the World U20 Championship in Hammer Throw held in Nairobi, Kenya.

Competition record

References

2002 births
Living people
People from Raisio
Athletes (track and field) at the 2020 Summer Olympics
Finnish female hammer throwers
Olympic athletes of Finland
Sportspeople from Southwest Finland
21st-century Finnish women